Albert Timothy Bentley (born August 15, 1960) is a former American football running back in the National Football League (NFL) for the Indianapolis Colts and Pittsburgh Steelers. He also was a member of the Michigan Panthers and Oakland Invaders in the USFL. He played college football at the University of Miami.

Early years
Bentley attended Immokalee High School. He accepted a football scholarship from the University of Miami. He scored the winning touchdown in the 1984 Orange Bowl.

Professional career
Bentley was selected by the Michigan Panthers seventh overall in the 1984 USFL Territorial Draft. In 1985, the team merged with the Oakland Invaders.

He was also selected by the Indianapolis Colts in the second round (36th overall) of the 1984 NFL Supplemental Draft of USFL and CFL Players.

Professional career statistics

References

1960 births
Living people
Sportspeople from Naples, Florida
Players of American football from Florida
American football running backs
American football return specialists
Miami Hurricanes football players
Michigan Panthers players
Oakland Invaders players
Indianapolis Colts players
Pittsburgh Steelers players